Ebinger is a surname. Notable people with the surname include:

Blandine Ebinger (1899–1993), German actress
Bob Ebinger (born 1944), American politician
Josy Ebinger (1880–1955), Swiss-French businessman
Rebecca Goodgame Ebinger (born 1975), American judge

German-language surnames